Royal Air Freight (also known as Royal Air Charter) is an American passenger and cargo airline based in Waterford, Michigan, adjacent to the Oakland County International Airport. 
The airline is licensed and certified to serve the US, Canada and Mexico with charter passenger and air cargo services.

Its main base is Oakland County International Airport, located 6 miles west of Pontiac, Michigan.

History 

The airline started operations in 1961 and has 30 pilots. Kirt Kostich serves as president of Royal Air Freight Inc., and members of the Kostich family serve as the firm’s officers.

Fleet 

The airlines fleet includes the following aircraft, among others (as of January 8, 2010)

7 Cessna 310R
 6 Dassault Falcon 20
 5 Embraer EMB 110 Bandeirante
 6 Learjet 25B
 4 Learjet 35A

Accidents 

The airline has had some accidents and safety issues including:

 The pilot and co-pilot of a Royal Air Freight Learjet 35 A (registration N720RA) were killed when it crashed while attempting its final approach to land at Chicago Executive Airport on January 5, 2010.  The plane was not carrying cargo at the time and was heading to the airport to pick up cargo.
 2014 crash short of runway at home base PTK. Fatal for sole occupant pilot. NTSB report recently released.

References

External links
 
 Oakland County International Airport website

1961 establishments in Michigan
Airlines based in Michigan
Companies based in Oakland County, Michigan
Cargo airlines of the United States
Charter airlines of the United States
American companies established in 1961
Airlines established in 1961